Duus is a Danish surname. 
It is possibly the name for several noble lineages in Denmark. However, one can be traced back to a diploma, given in 1258 to Borchadus & Hartwicus Dus, brothers and knights in the Duchy of Holstein. However, a Niels Mandorp Duus is also mentioned in 1315.

Notable people with this surname include:
 Bryony Duus (born 1977), Australian football player and coach
 Christian Duus (born 1974), Danish football player
 Gordon Duus (born 1954), American environmental attorney
 Jesper Duus (born 1967), Danish ice hockey player 
 John Duus (1906-1991), English athlete
 John Duus (sport shooter) (born 1955), Norwegian sport shooter

References